Statistics of Úrvalsdeild in the 1960 season.

Overview
It was contested by 6 teams, and ÍA won the championship. ÍA's Ingvar Elísson and KR's Þórólfur Beck were the joint top scorers with 15 goals.

League standings

Results
Each team played every opponent once home and away for a total of 10 matches.

References

Úrvalsdeild karla (football) seasons
Iceland
Iceland
Urvalsdeild